Mark Matthews was the oldest surviving Buffalo Soldier in the United States Army when he died at age 111 in 2005.

Mark Matthews may also refer to: 
 Mark A. Matthews (1867–1940), Presbyterian minister and Prohibitionist
 Marvin Kratter or Mark Matthews (1915–1999), New York real estate investor and musician
 Mark Matthews (lacrosse) (born 1990), Canadian and American lacrosse player

See also
 Mark Mathews (born 1983), Australian professional surfer 
 Marc Matthews (born 1940s), writer from Guyana
 Mark A. Mathews (1926–2018), American academic